WRDK (90.7 FM) was a radio station licensed to serve Bladenboro, North Carolina, United States.  The station was owned by Richburg Educational Broadcasters, Inc. The station surrendered its license on March 12, 2018; the Federal Communications Commission cancelled it on March 22.

References

External links

RDK
Radio stations established in 2011
2011 establishments in North Carolina
Radio stations disestablished in 2018
2018 disestablishments in North Carolina
Defunct radio stations in the United States
RDK